Chimie ParisTech (officially École nationale supérieure de chimie de Paris (National Chemical Engineering Institute in Paris), also known as ENSCP or Chimie Paris), founded in 1896 within the University of Paris, is an engineering school and a constituent college of PSL Research University specialised in chemical science. It is located in the 5th arrondissement of Paris.

Most of the students enter the school after highly competitive exams known as the Concours commun Mines-Ponts, following at least two years of classes préparatoires. There is also a small number of excellent students from French universities admitted to the school. Chimie ParisTech is known as France's most selective chemical engineering college

The school is a research center hosting ten laboratories which conduct high level research in various fields of chemistry.

History
The École nationale supérieure de chimie de Paris was founded in 1896 by Charles Friedel, a chemist and mineralogist who headed the school until 1899. At the time, the school was called the Laboratoire de chimie pratique et industrielle. It was located in the 6th arrondissement (rue Michelet), where it stayed until 1923.

After the death of Friedel, Henri Moissan took the reins of the school. He was awarded the Nobel Prize for chemistry in 1906, while he was director. Moissan made student admission subject to competitive exams and renamed the school Institut de chimie appliquée (Institute of Applied Chemistry).

In 1907, the school began delivering a prestigious masters of engineering. In the same year, Moissan died and a transitional directorate was created. Soon thereafter, Camille Chabrié was named director. The school closed when World War I started and reopened in 1916. This was also the first year a female student was admitted; the ENSCP was one of the first engineering schools in France to do so.

In 1923, the school moved to its current location, on the rue Pierre et Marie Curie (in the 5th arrondissement). The buildings were designed and built by Henri-Paul Nénot, architect of the Sorbonne. In 1932, the school became l'Institut de Chimie de Paris (Paris Institute of Chemistry). Finally, in 1948, it became the École nationale supérieure de chimie de Paris (ENSCP).

ENSCP directors
1896 - 1899 : Charles Friedel
1899 - 1907 : Henri Moissan (Nobel Prize in chemistry)
1907 - 1908 : collective direction
1908 - 1928 : Camille Chabrié
1928 - 1938 : Georges Urbain (member of the French Academy of Sciences)
1938 - 1950 : Louis Hackspill
1950 - 1961 : Georges Chaudron (member of the French Academy of Sciences)
1961 - 1976 : Jacques Bénard
1976 - 1985 : Fernand Coussemant
1985 - 1987 : Jean Talbot
1987 - 1992 : Claude Quivoron
1992 - 1996 : Bernard Trémillon
1996 - 2005 : Danièle Olivier
2006 - 2010 : Alain Fuchs
2010 - 2015 : Valérie Cabuil
2015–present  : Christian Lerminiaux

Research units
Notable research units includes:

 Photovoltaic Energy Development and Research Institute, École nationale supérieure de chimie de Paris in association with the CNRS. Director Olivier Kerrec   and research director Daniel Lincot.

Notable alumni
 Alain Berton
Eugène Schueller, founder of L'Oréal
Jacques Bergier
Olivier Kahn
Jacques Livage
Henri B. Kagan

References

External links
Official site of ENSCP
ENSCP Alumni association
ParisTech website

Chemistry education
Engineering universities and colleges in France
ParisTech
Buildings and structures in the 5th arrondissement of Paris
Schools in Paris
Educational institutions established in 1896
1896 establishments in France